Emmanuel Piget (born February 25, 1984 in Cognac) is a French racing driver. In 2013 he starts in the Formula Renault 3.5.

Career 
Piget began his racing career in karting in 1997. He competed in karting until 2000. 2001 und 2002 he took part in some races of the Formula Renault 2000 Eurocup. From 2002 until 2004 he started in the French Formula Renault.

After a time without racing Piget returned to the motorsport in 2009. He competed in some races of the European F3 Open Championship in 2009 und 2010. His best results were two third places.

In 2013 he got a cockpit in the Formula Renault 3.5 at the new team Zeta Corse.

Career summary 
 1997–2000: Karting
 2001: Formula Renault 2000 Eurocup
 2002: Formula Renault 2000 Eurocup
 2002: French Formula Renault (17th position)
 2003: French Formula Renault (10th position)
 2004: French Formula Renault (25th position)
 2004: Spanish Formula 3, Winter Series
 2009: European F3 Open (23rd position)
 2010: European F3 Open (10th position)
 2013: Formula Renault 3.5

Complete Formula Renault 3.5 Series results
(key) (Races in bold indicate pole position) (Races in italics indicate fastest lap)

References

External links 
 
 

1984 births
Living people
People from Cognac, France
French racing drivers
Formula Renault Eurocup drivers
Euroformula Open Championship drivers
World Series Formula V8 3.5 drivers
Sportspeople from Charente
French Formula Renault 2.0 drivers
Zeta Corse drivers